Killian Burke (born 9 January 1993) is an Irish hurler who currently plays as a centre-back for the London senior team.

Born in Midleton, County Cork, Burke first played competitive hurling during his schooling at Midleton CBS Secondary School. He arrived on the inter-county scene at the age of seventeen when he first linked up with the Cork minor team, before later joining the under-21 side. He made his senior debut in the 2014 National Hurling League. Burke has since gone on to join Cork's championship panel.

At club level Burke is a one-time championship medallist with Midleton.

Career statistics

Honours

University College Cork
All-Ireland Freshers' Hurling Championship (1): 2012

Midleton
Cork Senior Hurling Championship (1): 2013

Cork
Munster Senior Hurling Championship (1): 2014 (sub)

References

1993 births
Living people
Midleton hurlers
Robert Emmett's (London) hurlers
Cork inter-county hurlers
London inter-county hurlers